Ivan Cleveland Rand  (April 27, 1884 – January 2, 1969) was a Canadian lawyer, politician, academic, and justice of the Supreme Court of Canada. He has been described as 'probably the greatest judge in Canada's history'.

Early life and career
Born in Moncton, New Brunswick, the son of Nelson Rand and Minnie Turner, he received a Bachelor of Arts degree from Mount Allison University in 1909. In 1912, he received a Bachelor of Law degree from Harvard Law School. He was called to the bar of New Brunswick in 1912. From 1912 to 1920, he practiced law in Medicine Hat, Alberta. Returning to Moncton in 1920, he joined the
Canadian National Railways as a counsel.

In 1924, he was named Attorney General of New Brunswick and was a member of the Legislative Assembly of New Brunswick from February to June 1925.

Judicial career 
On April 22, 1943, he was appointed to the Supreme Court of Canada on the recommendation of William Lyon Mackenzie King.

During his tenure, Rand delivered many leading judgments. He is perhaps best remembered for his judgment in Roncarelli v Duplessis, which has been described as "iconic".

In 1946, he developed the Rand formula requiring payment of trade union dues by all employees in the bargaining unit affected by a collective agreement, whether or not the employees are members of the union. This compromise was instrumental to the cessation of violence and promotion of industrial stability, as it required the unions to "work now, grieve later," and in exchange, the employers had to remit union dues by automatic check-off of the dues formula.

Post-Supreme Court career 
Rand retired from the Canadian Supreme Court on April 27, 1959, upon reaching the mandatory retirement age of 75.

From 1959 to 1964, he was the first Dean of the law school of the University of Western Ontario. In 1966, he chaired a Royal Commission into allegations of improper stock trading against Supreme Court of Ontario justice Leo Landreville.

In 1969, he was made a Companion of the Order of Canada. In He received honorary degrees from Mount Allison University, the University of New Brunswick, Dalhousie University, Queen's University, the University of Toronto, the University of Western Ontario and Columbia University.

Palestine 
Rand was Canada's appointee to the United Nations Special Committee on Palestine following World War II. As such, Rand visited Mandatory Palestine in 1947 and became a supporter of partition supporting UNSCOP's majority report which led to the United Nations Partition Plan for Palestine. He became a supporter of the state of Israel once it was created in 1948 and visited in 1959 to dedicate a forest in Jerusalem named in his honour. Rand's meeting with William Lovell Hull, a fellow Canadian, changed Rand's understanding of Zionism. Rand became the central and most influential swing vote on UNSCOP in favour of the United Nations Partition Plan for Palestine and the eventual creation of the State of Israel.

Assessment 
He has been described as 'probably the greatest judge in Canada's history' and 'perhaps the greatest exponent of the rule of law in the history of the Supreme Court of Canada'.

Biographer William Kaplan describes Rand as "an intolerant bigot" who disliked French Canadians, Catholics, Jews and Canadians who weren't of British stock. When his sister married an Acadian, Rand refused to talk to her for 30 years. Nevertheless, as a judge, Rand was a civil libertarian who struck down restrictive covenants that barred property from being sold or rented to Jews or non-whites, acknowledged the rights of Japanese Canadians who were being interned as enemy aliens during World War II, defended the rights to free speech of the Communist Party of Canada when it was banned by the Canadian government under the War Measures Act as well as the rights of Jehovah's Witnesses being persecuted under Quebec's Padlock Law. During his tenure as dean of the University of Western Ontario's law school he was reluctant to hire a Jewish applicant claiming that a small town like London, Ontario could not abide "too many Jews". He would complain regularly about people whose names ended with vowels. Kaplan explained this contradiction in describing Rand as a person with a "first rate mind but a third rate temperament".

Further reading

References

External links
 Ivan Rand and the UNSCOP Papers
 Supreme Court of Canada biography
 

1884 births
1969 deaths
Canadian university and college faculty deans
Companions of the Order of Canada
Harvard Law School alumni
Justices of the Supreme Court of Canada
Mount Allison University alumni
New Brunswick Liberal Association MLAs
People from Moncton
Canadian Zionists
People of the Israeli–Palestinian conflict
Academic staff of the University of Western Ontario